Amberjacks are Atlantic and Pacific fish in the genus Seriola of the family Carangidae. They are widely consumed across the world in various cultures, most notably for Pacific amberjacks in Japanese cuisine; they are most often found in the warmer parts of the oceans. There are many variations of amberjack, including greater amberjack (Atlantic), lesser amberjack (Atlantic), Almaco jack (Pacific), yellowtail (Pacific), and the banded rudderfish (Atlantic). Though most of the Seriola species are considered "amberjacks", the species  Seriola hippos (samson fish) is not.

Atlantic types

Greater amberjacks 

Greater amberjacks, Seriola dumerili, are the largest of the jacks.  They usually have dark stripes extending from nose to in front of their dorsal fins.  They have no scutes and soft dorsal bases less than twice the length of the anal fin bases.  They are usually 18 kg (40 pounds) or less, and are found associated with rocky reefs, debris, and wrecks, typically in 20 to 75 m (10 to 40 fathoms). Greater amberjacks are also found in the Pacific.

Lesser amberjacks 
Lesser amberjacks, Seriola fasciata, have proportionately larger eyes and deeper bodies than greater amberjacks.  They are olive green or brownish-black with silver sides, and usually have a dark band extending upward from their eyes.  Juveniles have split or wavy bars on their sides. The adults are usually under 5 kg (10 lbs).  They are found deeper than other jacks, commonly 50 to 130 m (30 to 70 fathoms).

Amberjacks are voracious predators, which feed on squid, fish, and crustaceans, and are thought to spawn offshore throughout most of the year.

Banded rudderfish 
Banded rudderfish, Seriola zonata, is the second-smallest amberjack. This jack can be distinguished from the pilot fish by the presence of a first dorsal fin. Juveniles are banded vertically like pilotfish, and follow large objects or animals. Large individuals (over 10 inches) have no bands. This fish, though commonly caught, is rarely identified. Large ones, with a raccoon-stripe on the eye and an iridescent gold stripe on the side, are usually called amberjacks when caught, and juveniles are called pilotfish. They are found as far north as Nova Scotia. They are less dependent on sharks, etc., than pilotfish. They can be caught on shrimp, silversides, lures (e.g. spoons), and flies.

Others 
Other species exist in other parts of the world, such as: yellowtail amberjack (including the Asian yellowtail, the California yellowtail, and yellowtail kingfish or southern yellowtail), Almaco jack, and Japanese amberjack (five-ray yellowtail).

Biology 

Amberjacks are predators. They feed on pelagic and benthic fish. Their prey also includes squid and crustaceans, as well as sardines and bigeye scad. Younger juvenile jacks tend to feed on plankton and small invertebrates.

Greater Amberjacks mature at around 4 years old, and migrate in late spring to early summer (March to June) to reproduce. They migrate to deeper water to spawn, producing their young near shipwrecks or large objects as a safe haven.

Females are much larger than males, and have a longer life expectancy. The maximum lifespan for females is 17 years, whilst the average is 10 due to popular demand for them in big game fishing and as a high-quality food fish.

Amberjacks are not top of the food chain in their habitat, and therefore are prone to being prey for Yellowfin Tuna, sharks and other larger fish.

References 

Carangidae
Fish common names
Fish of Pakistan
Fish of Hawaii